Montacher-Villegardin is a commune in the Yonne department in Bourgogne-Franche-Comté in north-central France.

Geography
The commune is traversed by the river Lunain, a tributary of the Loing.

See also
Communes of the Yonne department

References

Communes of Yonne